Apopterygion alta, known commonly as the tasselled triplefin, is a species of triplefin blenny. It is endemic to the waters off south-eastern Australia from northern Tasmania to Port Phillip in Victoria. It is normally observed on yellow sponges.

References

tasseled triplefin
Bass Strait
tasseled triplefin